HMS Saturn was a 74-gun third-rate ship of the line of the Royal Navy, launched on 22 November 1786 at Northam. The vessel served during the Napoleonic Wars with the Channel Fleet, taking part in the 1801 Battle of Copenhagen. With the beginning of the War of 1812, Saturn was modified to become a frigate designed to take on large American vessels of that type. Saturn was deployed as part of the blockading squadron of New York City from 1814 to 1815. From 1825, the vessel was in harbour service and was broken up in 1868.

Service history
In 1801, she served in the Channel Fleet under the command of Captain Boyles. Then under Captain Robert Lambert she sailed with Admiral Sir Hyde Parker's expedition to the Baltic. She was present at the Battle of Copenhagen as part of Admiral Parker's reserve.

Saturn was cut down to create a rasée 58-gun spar-decked frigate in 1813 at the Plymouth dockyards in preparation for service in the War of 1812. Three 74-gun ships were treated in this manner to produce 'super heavy frigates' that could take on the large American 44-gun frigates. Retaining their 32-pounder main armament, supplemented by 42-pounder carronades, the resulting frigates were much more powerful than the American frigates they were intended to engage. The rasée frigates proved to be very fast in heavy seas, but in lighter airs conventional frigates had a distinct advantage in speed. On 14 February 1814, under Captain James Nash, Saturn sailed for Bermuda; later she was on the Halifax station. She then served as part of the blockading-squadron off New York until the War of 1812 ended with the signing of the Treaty of Ghent in 1814.

On 25 May 1814 Saturn captured the American privateer schooner , of 211 tons (bm), at  after a four-hour chase. Hussar was armed with one 12-pounder gun and nine 12-pounder carronades, eight of which she threw overboard during the chase. Her complement consisted of 98 men. She had been in commission for only a week and had left New York the previous evening for her first cruise, bound for Newfoundland; she was provisioned for a four-month cruise. Nash described her as "coppered, copper-fastened, and sails remarkably fast". Hussar had been launched in 1812 and had made previous cruises, but apparently without success. She was under the command of Francis Jenkins when Saturn captured her.

From January 1815, Captain Thomas Brown, assumed command of Saturn until  Captain Nash returned to command in April 1815.

Fate
From 1825 Saturn was on harbour service at Milford Haven. She was broken up in 1868. By that time she was the last survivor of her class of 12 ships.

Notes, citations, and references

Notes

Citations

References

 Cranwell, John Philips, & William Bowers Crane (1940) Men of marque; a history of private armed vessels out of Baltimore during the War of 1812. (New York, W.W. Norton & Co.). 
 Emmons, George Foster (1853) The navy of the United States, from the commencement, 1775 to 1853; with a brief history of each vessel’s service and fate ... Comp. by Lieut. George F. Emmons ... under the authority of the Navy Dept. To which is added a list of private armed vessels, fitted out under the American flag ... also a list of the revenue and coast survey vessels, and principal ocean steamers, belonging to citizens of the United States in 1850. (Washington: Gideon & Co.)
 Lavery, Brian (2003) The Ship of the Line - Volume 1: The development of the battlefleet 1650-1850. Conway Maritime Press. .
 

Ships of the line of the Royal Navy
Arrogant-class ships of the line
1786 ships
War of 1812 ships of the United Kingdom